Christian Durniak (born 4 April 1949) is a French rower. He competed in the men's coxed pair event at the 1972 Summer Olympics.

References

1949 births
Living people
French male rowers
Olympic rowers of France
Rowers at the 1972 Summer Olympics
Place of birth missing (living people)